Caleb Willoughby Shaffner (February 1, 1846 – December 28, 1904) was a travelling salesman and political figure in Nova Scotia, Canada. He represented Annapolis County in the Nova Scotia House of Assembly from 1878 to 1882 as a Conservative member.

He was born in Nicteaux, Annapolis County, Nova Scotia, of German descent, and was educated at Acadia College. In 1871, he married Annie Wood. He was a lieutenant-colonel in the local militia. Shaffner lived in Wilmot, Nova Scotia. He died in Truro at the age of 87.

References 
The Canadian parliamentary companion and annual register, 1880, CH Mackintosh 
 A Directory of the Members of the Legislative Assembly of Nova Scotia, 1758-1958, Public Archives of Nova Scotia (1958)

1845 births
1932 deaths
Progressive Conservative Association of Nova Scotia MLAs
People from Annapolis County, Nova Scotia